NYTF may refer to:

National Yiddish Theatre Folksbiene
New York Television Festival